Henrietta Doran-York (born 30 August 1962) is a politician from Sint Maarten. She was Minister Plenipotentiary of Sint Maarten from 19 November 2015 until 15 January 2018. She previously served as Deputy Minister Plenipotentiary. Doran-York is a member of the National Alliance party, and has run in several elections.

Doran-York had a career in the prison system of Sint Maarten, then under control of the Netherlands Antilles. She eventually became head supervisor. In the 2010 Netherlands Antilles general election, Doran-York obtained a seat. In 2011 she became a manager at the Sint Maarten Ministry of Justice. In May 2015 she became head of the Windward Islands Civil Servants Union/Private Sector Union.

Her son Egbert Jurendy Doran was elected to the Estates of Sint Maarten in the 2018 Sint Maarten general election.

References

1962 births
Living people
Members of the Estates of the Netherlands Antilles
Ministers plenipotentiary (Sint Maarten)
National Alliance (Sint Maarten) politicians
Sint Maarten women in politics